Sven Koenig is the name of:
 Sven Koenig (computer scientist), computer scientist at the University of Southern California
 Sven Koenig (cricketer) (born 1973), South African cricketer